Anaceratagallia is a genus of insects belonging to the family Cicadellidae.

The genus was first described by Aleksei Zachvatkin in 1946.

The species of this genus are found in Eurasia and Africa.

Species:
 Anaceratagallia estonica
 Anaceratagallia venosa

References

Cicadellidae